Juliette Noel Toussaint (c. 1786 – May 14, 1851) was a Haitian-American philanthropist and freed slave who collaborated closely with her husband Pierre Toussaint in helping the poor and doing charitable works in downtown New York. Her husband was declared a Venerable in 1996 by Pope John Paul II.

Her name is listed among the donors of the New York African Society for Mutual Relief.

Life

Early life
Little is known about the early life of Juliette. She was born into slavery in the former French colony of Haiti about the year 1786. The Noel family came to Baltimore with their slave owners at some point during the Haitian Revolution. There she labored as a housemaid, assistant cook and nanny.

Marriage and family

In the wake of the Haitian Revolution, Pierre Toussaint's master went into exile in New York City with him, which granted them the opportunity of meeting one another. Juliette was twenty years younger than him. While still working for her master, Pierre saved enough money to purchase her freedom. On August 5, 1811, they were married privately. For four years they boarded at the house of Pierre's master before settling themselves finally on Franklin Street. Pierre worked on as a hairdresser while Juliette focused on the household needs and availed herself in volunteering for the local church activities.

They adopted Euphemia, the daughter of Pierre's late sister Rosalie who had died of tuberculosis, raising the girl as their own. They provided for her education and music classes.

Philanthropy
The couple attended daily masses and began a career of charity among the poor of New York City regardless of color and creed. They often brought baked goods to the children of the Orphan Asylum and donated money to its operations. In their own house, they sheltered and fostered numerous street children, travelers and homeless people.

Together the Toussaints organized a credit bureau, an employment agency, and a refuge for priests. Many Haitian refugees went to them whom they helped in finding jobs. They often arranged sales of goods so they could raise money to live on. With the Oblate Sisters of Providence, they established a school for black children.

They also helped raise money in building a new Roman Catholic church in New York, which became Old St. Patrick's Cathedral on Mott Street. Pierre was a benefactor also of the first New York City Catholic school for Black children at St. Vincent de Paul on Canal Street.

Later years
On May 14, 1851, Juliette died of natural causes. Two years later, Pierre Toussaint died on June 30, 1853. They were buried alongside Euphemia, in the cemetery of St. Patrick's Old Cathedral.

References

External links
Marie-Rose Juliette Noel Toussaint at Find a Grave.

1780s births
1851 deaths
Year of birth uncertain
Haitian Roman Catholics
African-American Catholics
Haitian slaves
Free Negroes
French emigrants to the United States
Burials at St. Patrick's Old Cathedral
18th-century American slaves
19th-century American slaves
American women philanthropists